Robert Wynne (1851–1922) was an American official, diplomat and journalist.

Robert Wynne may also refer to:
Robert Wynne (MP for Caernarvon) (1690–1762), MP for Caernarvon 1754–61
Robert Wynne (Chancellor of St Asaph) (c. 1661–1743), Welsh priest and academic
Robert Wynne (Archdeacon of Aghadoe) (1838–1912), Irish priest
Robert Wynne (Virginia politician) (1622–1675), member of the Virginia House of Burgesses 1658 and 1660–74, Speaker 1662–74
Robert Wynne (Irish politician) (1761–1838), MP for Sligo Borough 1789–99
Robert Watkin Wynne (c. 1754–1806), Welsh politician, MP for Denbighshire 1789–96

See also
Robert Wynn (disambiguation)
Robert Wynne-Edwards (1897–1974), British civil engineer and army officer